List of Star Trek films and television series may refer to:
 List of Star Trek films
 List of Star Trek television series